David Hawkins (born 11 August 1931) is an English former professional footballer of the 1950s.  He played professionally for Gillingham and made a total of 14 appearances in the Football League.

References

1931 births
Living people
English footballers
Association football forwards
English Football League players
Gillingham F.C. players
Footballers from Kingston upon Thames